Elena Yurievna Smurova (born January 18, 1974, in Leningrad) is a Russian water polo player, who won the bronze medal at the 2000 Summer Olympics. She was the topscorer of the 2005 FINA Women's Water Polo World League, scoring a total number of 31 goals.

See also
 Russia women's Olympic water polo team records and statistics
 List of Olympic medalists in water polo (women)
 List of players who have appeared in multiple women's Olympic water polo tournaments
 List of World Aquatics Championships medalists in water polo

External links
 

1974 births
Living people
Russian female water polo players
Olympic water polo players of Russia
Water polo players at the 2000 Summer Olympics
Water polo players at the 2004 Summer Olympics
Water polo players at the 2008 Summer Olympics
Olympic bronze medalists for Russia
Olympic medalists in water polo
World Aquatics Championships medalists in water polo
Medalists at the 2000 Summer Olympics